Edgar Rice Updegraff (March 1, 1922 – December 23, 2022) was an American amateur golfer and urologist.

Undegraff was born in Boone, Iowa, and is a descendent of the German Op den Graeff family.

Biography

Medical career

He received his bachelor's and master's degrees from the Iowa State University and his medical degree from the University of Iowa. Unlike his father and brothers, who were otolaryngologists, Updegraff chose urology as a specialty. He eventually settled into practice in Tucson, Arizona, in 1951, partially because of the opportunity to continue playing golf there.

Sporting career

Updegraff had a long amateur career, winning many tournaments on a local, state, and national scale, including the Western Amateur (1957, 1959), Sunnehanna Amateur (1962), Pacific Coast Amateur (1967), and U.S. Senior Amateur (1981). He was a semi-finalist at 1963 British Amateur. He played on three winning Walker Cup teams (1963, 1965, 1969) and captained the 1975 team to a win. He also finished in a tie for 4th place at the 1969 Tucson Open on the PGA Tour but failed to sign his scorecard and was disqualified.

Updegraff received the Bob Jones Award from the United States Golf Association in 1999. He was inducted into the Arizona Golf Hall of Fame in 1969 and the Iowa Golf Association Hall of Fame in 2006.

As of June 2021, Updegraff lived at Saddlebrooke Ranch. He turned 100 in March 2022, and died on December 23, 2022, in Saddlebrooke, Arizona.

Amateur wins
1940 Northwest Amateur
1941 Northwest Amateur
1947 Northwest Amateur
1952 Arizona Amateur
1954 Southwestern Amateur
1955 Southwestern Amateur, Arizona Amateur
1957 Western Amateur
1959 Western Amateur
1961 Southwestern Amateur, Arizona Amateur
1962 Sunnehanna Amateur
1967 Pacific Coast Amateur
1969 Southwestern Amateur, Arizona Amateur
1981 U.S. Senior Amateur

Sources:

U.S. national team appearances
Walker Cup: 1963 (winners), 1965 (tied, cup retained), 1969 (winners), 1975 (winners, non-playing captain)
Americas Cup: 1963 (winners), 1967 (winners, non-playing captain)

References

American male golfers
Amateur golfers
Golfers from Iowa
Golfers from Arizona
American urologists
University of Iowa alumni
Iowa State University alumni
People from Boone, Iowa
Sportspeople from Tucson, Arizona
American centenarians
Men centenarians
1922 births
2022 deaths